Sekamaanya Kisolo, also spelled as Ssekamaanya Kisolo, was Kabaka of the Kingdom of Buganda between 1614 and 1634. He was the twelfth Kabaka of Buganda.

Claim to the throne
He was the youngest son of Kabaka Mulondo Sekajja, Kabaka of Buganda. His mother was Nakku of the Ffumbe clan, the only wife his father married. He ascended to the throne upon the death of his uncle, Suuna I, in 1614. He established his capital at Kongojje Hill.

Married life
He married one wife, one Nabakyaala Nabuuso, daughter of Gunju of the Butiko clan.

Issue
Kabaka Sekamaanya was the father of Kabaka Kateregga Kamegere, the fourteenth Kabaka of Buganda, who was his only son.

Final years
He is buried at Kongojje, Busiro.

Succession table

See also
 Kabaka of Buganda
 Buganda

References

External links
 List of the Kings of Buganda

Kabakas of Buganda
17th-century African people
1584 deaths
Year of birth unknown